William Ros, 6th Baron Ros (c. 1370 – 1 November 1414) was a medieval English nobleman, politician and soldier. The second son of Thomas Ros, 4th Baron Ros and Beatrice Stafford, William inherited his father's barony and estates (with extensive lands centred on Lincolnshire) in 1394. He married Margaret, daughter of Baron Fitzalan, shortly afterwards. The Fitzalan family, like that of Ros, was well-connected at the local and national level. They were implacably opposed to King Richard II, and this may have soured Richard's opinion of the young Ros.

The late 14th century was a period of political crisis in England. Richard II confiscated the estates of his cousin, Henry Bolingbroke, Duke of Lancaster, in 1399 and exiled him. Bolingbroke invaded England several months later, and Ros took his side almost immediately. Richard's support had deserted him; Ros was alongside Henry when Richard surrendered his throne to the invader, becoming King Henry IV, and later voted in the House of Lords for the former king's imprisonment. Ros benefited from the new Lancastrian regime, achieving far more than he had ever done under Richard. He became an important aide and counsellor to King Henry and regularly spoke for him in parliament. He also supported Henry in his military campaigns, participating in the invasion of Scotland in 1400 and assisting in the suppression of Richard Scrope, Archbishop of York's rebellion five years later.

In return for his loyalty to the new regime, Ros received extensive royal patronage. This included lands, grants, wardships and the right to arrange the wards' marriages. Ros performed valuable service as an adviser and ambassador (perhaps most importantly to Henry, who was often in a state of near-penury; Ros was a wealthy man, and regularly loaned the crown large amounts of money). Important as he was in government and the regions, Ros was unable to avoid the tumultuous regional conflicts and feuds which were rife at this time. In 1411 he was involved in a land dispute with a powerful Lincolnshire neighbour, and narrowly escaped an ambush; he sought—and received—redress in parliament. Partly because of Ros's restraint in not seeking the severe penalties available to him, he was described by a twentieth-century historian as a particularly wise and forbearing figure for his time.

King Henry IV died in 1413. Ros did not long survive him, and played only a minor role in government during the last year of his life. He may have been out of favour with the new king, Henry V. Henry—as Prince of Wales—had fallen out with his father a few years before, and Ros had supported King Henry over his son. William Ros died in Belvoir Castle on 1 November 1414. His wife survived him by twenty-four years; his son and heir, John, was still a minor. John later fought at Agincourt in 1415, and died childless in France in 1421. The Barony of Ros was then inherited by William's second son, Thomas, who also died in military service in France seven years after his brother.

Background and career under Richard II

The exact date of William Ros's birth is unknown. He was described in 1394 as about twenty-three years old, which would place his birth year around 1370. The Ros family was an important one in Lincolnshire and Yorkshire, and the historian Chris Given-Wilson has described them as one of the greatest fourteenth-century baronial families to never receive an earldom. Ros's father was Thomas Ros, 4th Baron Ros, who fought in the Hundred Years War under Edward III (particularly in the Poitiers campaign of 1356). Several years before William's birth, King Edward instructed Thomas Ros to remain with his army on his Irish estates "to prevent the loss and destruction of the country". Thomas married Beatrice, the widow of Maurice Fitzgerald, Earl of Desmond and daughter of the first Earl of Stafford. He died in Uffington, Lincolnshire in June 1384, and his eldest son John—William's elder brother—inherited the title as fifth Baron Ros.

Ros also had two younger brothers, Robert and Thomas, "of whom nothing is known". John's career was brief. By 1382 he had married Mary, half-sister of the Earl of Northumberland. John fought for the new king, Richard II (heir of Edward III, who died in 1377), in the 1385–86 Scottish campaign and with the Earl of Arundel in France the following year. During the early 1390s, John made a pilgrimage to Jerusalem; he died in Paphos on 6 August 1393, on his return journey to England. John and Mary had not produced an heir, and (although he was never expected to succeed to the barony) Ros was next in line. He inherited as sixth Baron Ros, by which time he had been knighted and  appointed to the Privy Council.

Inheritance and marriage 

The Ros estates were primarily in the east and north of England. William received livery of them in January 1384, which gave him an extensive sphere of influence around Lincolnshire, Nottinghamshire, and eastern Yorkshire. By this time, the estate had two dowager baronesses to support: his deceased brother's wife Mary and their mother, Beatrice. Mary died within a year of her husband, and her extensive inheritance was divided among her Percy relations. Ros received her dower lands, which included the ancient Barony of Helmsley. Beatrice, on the other hand, had outlived three husbands and would outlive William; she was assigned her dower lands in December 1384. This meant that Ros would never hold a large swath of land, predominantly in the East Riding of Yorkshire.

Ros received seisin of his estates on 11 February 1394, which included custody of several Clifford family estates; his sister had married Thomas de Clifford, 6th Baron de Clifford around 1379. He held the latter lands until their son came of age around 1411. Ros married Margaret, daughter of John Fitzalan, 1st Baron Arundel and Eleanor Maltravers, soon after he inherited. She was already in receipt of a 40-mark annuity from King Richard II because she had been in the household of Richard's recently deceased queen, Anne of Bohemia. His wife gave Ros what may have appeared to be a useful connection to the crown. Also useful to William was the fact that his wife's father had recently died, so Ros now had the Earl of Arundel as a brother-in-law. His new connections and the higher political profile they brought may account for the royal grants he soon received of Clifford manors in Yorkshire, Derbyshire, and Worcestershire. These had been the dower lands of Euphemia (widow of Robert, Lord Clifford), who had died in November 1393. Ros attended the king's wedding to his second wife—the French King's daughter, Isabella of Valois—in Calais in December 1396. His wife's grandfather died the following year, and she became Lady Maltravers suo jure.

Although Ros received some royal favour, Charles Ross has suggested that he may not have been doing as well as expected for a man in his position. Ross suggests that William's Fitzalan connections might have worked against him with the king. Arundel was a staunch political opponent of Richard's, and Ros's marrying into this politically unpopular family may account for the few offices the king granted him. "It seems strange", says Ross, "that a wealthy young lord, who later proved himself both active and able in the royal service, had no public, and very little local employment during the later years of Richard II". Ros's situation would not change until the accession of Arundel's political ally, Henry Bolingbroke, as King Henry IV in 1399. He was rarely appointed to peace commissions and did not sit on many oyer and Terminer arrays, even in his own counties.

Regime change and career under Henry IV 

John of Gaunt—the most powerful noble in the country and second only to the crown in wealth—died in February 1399. Bolingbroke and King Richard had fallen out the previous year, and Richard had exiled Bolingbroke for six years the previous September. Instead of allowing Bolingbroke to succeed to his father's estates and titles, says Given-Wilson, Richard "succumb[ed] to the temptation" to confiscate the Duchy of Lancaster. Richard proclaimed that Bolingbroke's exile was now a life sentence, and cancelled his writs of seisin. He further decreed that Bolingbroke could only request his inheritance at the king's pleasure. Bolingbroke, in Paris, joined forces with the also-exiled Thomas Arundel. Arundel had been Archbishop of Canterbury, and was Ros's wife's uncle; he lost his office because of his involvement with the Lords Appellant, and been exiled since 1397. With Arundel and a small group of followers, Bolingbroke landed at Ravenspur in Yorkshire in late June 1399. Ros, bringing a large retinue, joined Bolingbroke's army almost immediately (as did much of the northern nobility). Richard was campaigning in Ireland at the time, and unable to defend his throne. Henry initially announced that he intended only to reclaim his rights as Duke of Lancaster, although he quickly gained enough power and support (including that of Ros) to claim the throne in Richard's stead and have himself proclaimed King Henry IV. In June, Ros was present at Berkeley Castle when Henry and Richard met for the first time since Henry was exiled; de Ros witnessed their final meeting on 6 September at the Tower of London, when Richard resigned the throne. Bolingbroke's accession as Henry IV saw an uplift in Ros's fortunes and those of the Fitzalans. Ros now had strong connections with important figures at court and a relatively close friendship with the new king. In contrast to his treatment by Richard, Ros's previous loyal service to Henry—and the king's father—earned him significant royal patronage. In the first parliament of the new reign—held at Westminster in October 1399—he was appointed a Trier of Petitions, and was one of the lords who voted to imprison Richard (who later died in Pontefract Castle of unknown causes). Ros's new position at the centre of government was highlighted in December 1399, when he was appointed to Henry's first royal council.

Ros's motives for joining Bolingbroke's invasion so swiftly are unknown but, says Given-Wilson, this should be no surprise; for most of Henry's new-found allies, "it is only possible to speculate as to their political allegiance". Ros may have felt generally aggrieved by Richard's poor treatment of Gaunt and Bolingbroke, and his own lack of promotion under Richard was doubtless influential. Whatever his reasons were for rebelling in 1399, Ros and his father had been Lancastrian (rather than Ricardian) in their loyalties. His father had been one of John of Gaunt's earliest retainers when the young Gaunt was Earl of Richmond, and Ros had also been retained by Gaunt in the late fourteenth century. Service to the duke had involved Ros accompanying the duke abroad and travelling on his business on at least five occasions in the last years of Gaunt's life. For his services Ros received annuities of £40 to £50, and was one of only two knights banneret whom Gaunt retained.

Local administration and political crisis 
Ros was an active royal official in the local administration and became a leading member of political society in the north Midlands and Yorkshire, where he regularly headed royal commissions. He was frequently appointed a justice of the peace, particularly in Leicestershire. Ros's service to the crown was not confined to the regions; in 1401, he directed the king's attempts to increase the royal income. He was appointed Henry's negotiator with the House of Commons, to persuade the Commons to agree to a subsidy for the king's intended invasion of Scotland later that summer. Ros and the Commons representatives met in Westminster's refectory.  Emphasising "favourable consideration" the Commons would receive from the king, he played heavily on the king's expenses in defending the Welsh and Scottish Marches. Each party was wary of the other; the king did not wish to set a precedent, and the Commons were traditionally wary of the House of Lords. Six years later, Ros played much the same role—with the Duke of York and the Archbishop of Canterbury, on a committee hearing the Commons' complaints. The result of these discussions was an altercation in which the Commons, reports the parliament roll, were "hugely disturbed". This disturbance, according to J. H. Wylie, was probably the result of something Ros said and would account for the Commons' reluctance to meet him or his committee. Ros's remit was to persuade the Commons to grant as substantial a tax—in exchange for as few liberties granted—as possible. An experienced parliamentarian, he attended most parliaments from 1394 to 1413.

Almost from the beginning of his reign, Henry faced problems. Most stemmed from financial insecurity since by 1402 his treasury was empty. Around this time, Ros was appointed Lord Treasurer. Charles Ross suggests that this demonstrated the king's increased confidence in Ros, who occupied the post for the next four years. He was unable to substantially improve Henry's financial situation, and relations with the Commons worsened. During the 1404 parliament, speaker Arnold Savage confronted the king over his lack of money (and repeated demands for taxation), which Savage said could be ameliorated by reducing the number of annuities paid by the crown. Savage also condemned an unnamed crown minister for owing royal creditors over £6,000. The House of Commons' dissatisfaction was obvious to the king, who responded within the week. He despatched Ros, accompanied by Chancellor Henry Beaufort, to the Commons with a comprehensive breakdown of the king's financial requirements. According to Ian Mortimer, "Savage, having attacked royal policy in the King's presence, had no compunction about speaking his mind to the chancellor and treasurer". Henry's government continued to subsist on poor revenues. As Given-Wilson put it, the treasury became "largely reliant on a diminishing circle of the faithful" (which included Ros). He made numerous loans to the king, and temporarily surrendered his councillor's salary for the sake of the royal finances.

Ros also performed extensive military service. In 1400, he contracted with the king to bring a fully crewed ship of twenty men at arms and forty archers to Henry's Scottish invasion. Although the campaign fizzled out, Ros played a part in it. Returning to Westminster, he resumed his office of councillor and participated in Henry's Great Council the following year. In 1402 Owain Glyndŵr rebelled, which impacted Ros personally. His brother-in-law, Reginald, Lord Grey of Ruthin—who had married Ros's youngest sister, Margaret—was captured and imprisoned by Glyndŵr; personal animosity between Grey and Glyndŵr may have been to blame for the outbreak of the rebellion. The Welsh demanded a 10,000-mark ransom from the king, who agreed to pay. Ros, because of his relationship to Grey, also agreed to contribute and led the commission which negotiated with Glyndŵr over its payment and his brother-in-law's release. A friend of Ros, fellow Midlands baron Robert, Lord Willoughby, accompanied him in the negotiations.

Ros was also elected to the Order of the Garter in 1402, and was granted an annuity of 100 marks a year as the king's retainer two years later. In May of that year another rebellion broke out in the north, led by Richard Scrope, Archbishop of York and the disaffected Henry Percy, 1st Earl of Northumberland. One of their first acts was to kidnap the king's envoy. Ros was part of an extensive network of north Lancastrian loyalists who gathered around the king's cousin Ralph Neville, Earl of Westmorland to suppress the rebellion. Henry entrusted Ros to meet with Westmorland, commander of the king's armies in the north. Ros was probably chosen because of the king's intimate advisors, his local knowledge would have been the most valuable. The mission was a success; Ros witnessed the Earl of Northumberland surrendering Berwick Castle to the king, and sat on the commission which condemned Scrope to death without trial in early June 1405. When the king arrived in York to oversee the execution of the rebels, Ros brought Percy's bonds to him.

Since Ros had been instructed only to engage the rebels on the king's express instruction, it is difficult to ascertain the role that he and Gascoigne played in the rebellion's suppression. Unlike the Earl of Westmorland, "no more is heard of their activities" in the north until after the confrontation at Shipton Moor. Ros's role may have been to oversee the later judicial commissions over the rebels, and he was authorised to pardon those who rejected rebellion and wished to return to the king's grace. The fact that so little of their work remains visible to historians may suggest surreptitiousness; possibly, says Given-Wilson, they were little more than spies tailing their prey until the king's main army caught up.

The following year, the king's health (which had not been strong for some time) broke down for good. At the parliament of 1406, Henry IV agreed that since it was clear that poor health prevented him from ruling, a Grand Council should be established to assist him in governing. Although Ros was on the original list presented to parliament of those to be appointed to the council, how long he served is subject to conjecture. He was attending its meetings in late 1406 (since he was an unofficial "chaperone" for his successor as Lord Treasurer, Lord Furnivall), and may have still been on the council the following June. Ros regularly witnessed royal charters, and continued his role as the king's spokesman to the Commons. He probably assisted the Lord Chancellor through an increasingly difficult and uncertain period (due to the King's ill health), but it is uncertain whether he chose—or was instructed—to do so.

Royal favour 

For the duration of Henry's reign, Ros was "high in the King's confidence and enjoyed especially trusted positions". The historian Mark Arvanigian summarises Ros's position as "clearly a reliable and trusted servant, as well as being a reasonably talented administrator and royal councillor". Henry continued relying on loans to carry out policy, and Ros's loan funded the Calais garrison. Unlike many—and indicating the favour with which the King held him in—Ros was promised repayment, manifested in the royal patronage he continued to receive. By 1409, for example, he had been appointed to the lucrative positions of master forester and constable of Pickering Castle. These offices strengthened his influence in the region, allowed him to appoint deputies, and gave him another patronage of his own to dispense. In October of that year, Ros paid £80 for the custody of  Giffard family lands in the South Midlands. John Tuchet, Lord Audley died in December, and Ros was granted Audley's lands while the Audley heir was a minor. Ros also paid £2,000 for the right to arrange the heir's marriage. The Audley estates from which Ros intended to get his money back were greatly overvalued, and he was charged only half the original amount. These grants were in addition to his annual conciliar salary of £100, and he held the manor of Chingford to quarter himself and his men when he was regularly in the south on royal business. Ros remained an active councillor and undertook significant military and diplomatic roles. He was one of Henry's few advisors who, even when the king's council was not sitting, remained a close counsellor.

Ros remained in the King's favour through the final years of Henry's reign. As a trusted counsellor, in 1410 he participated in what has been described as "a show trial of national importance". The previous year, an ecclesiastical court had found John Badby of Evesham guilty of Lollardy. According to church custom, Badby had been given a year's grace to recant. He refused; if anything, his opinions were more entrenched than before. On 1 March 1410, Badby was brought before a convocation at the Friars-Preachers House. Ros and his fellow barons found Badby guilty and passed secular judgement. He was burnt to death (possibly, according to sixteenth-century martyrologist John Foxe, in a barrel) in Smithfield.

Regional disorder 
After the death of the Earl of Stafford in 1403 (whose infant heir had a twenty-year minority), Ros was the leading baron in Staffordshire. He was responsible for upholding the king's peace during a period that has been a by-word for the kind of pervasive lawlessness that Ros, like all regional magnates, was expected to suppress. Particularly well-known is the frequency with which the baronage and gentry indulged in internecine fighting. In 1411, his intervention averted a tense situation which was likely to erupt into armed conflict between local gentry Alexander Mering and John Tuxford. This was only a temporary ceasefire, however; the following year, Ros sponsored a second arbitration between the parties with which they promised to abide on pain of a 500-mark fine. In early 1411 Sir Walter Tailboys caused a riot in Lincoln, attacked the sheriffs, killed two men, and lay in wait outside the city in ambush (preventing its residents from leaving). Lincoln's citizens petitioned the king for justice and explicitly requested that Ros and his kinsman, Lord Beaumont, be appointed to investigate. They found in favour of the Lincoln citizenry and, reflecting the severity of Tailboy's offence, he was bound over to keep the peace for £3,000. Due to such efforts, Simon Payling has suggested that Ros's "reputation for fair-mindedness" made him a popular figure for settling gentry disputes.

Despite his aptitude for dispute resolution, Ros was not exempt from local conflict. He became involved in a dispute with his Lincolnshire neighbour, Sir Robert Tirwhit, in 1411. Tirwhit was a newly appointed royal justice and a well-known figure in the county. He and Ros fell out over conflicting claims to common grazing and associated hay-mowing and turf-digging rights in Wrawby. An arbitration took place before Justice William Gascoigne, who ordered a Loveday arranged. The Loveday was intended to offer both parties the opportunity to demonstrate their support for the arbitration process; the two men were expected to attend with companions (or followers), keeping their numbers to a minimum. Tirwhit, however, brought a small army of about 500 men. Later justifying the size, he claimed not to have agreed to the Loveday in the first place. Ros kept to the arrangement vis á vis his retinue, bringing with him only Lords Beaumont and de la Warre (the latter, like Beaumont, a relative).

He and his companions escaped Tirwhit's ambush unharmed. Given-Wilson has argued that, although the case was not uncommon in its basic facts, "the personal involvement of a royal justice in such a calculated act of violence, and the status of the protagonists, clearly gave it an interest above the usual". On 4 November 1411, Ros petitioned parliament—at which he was appointed a Trier of Petitions—for satisfaction. The case was heard before the Lord Chamberlain and the Archbishop of Canterbury, and took over three weeks to determine. The Chamberlain and Archbishop requested the attendance of Ros and all the "knyghtes and Esquiers and Yomen that had ledynge of men" for him. After deliberating, they found firmly in Ros's favour. Tirwhit was bound to give Ros a quantity of Gascon wine and provide the food and drink for the next Loveday, where he would publicly apologise to Ros. In his apology, Tirwhit acknowledged that a nobleman of Ros's position could also have brought an army and he had shown forbearance in not doing so. The only responsibility Ros was given as part of the arbitration award was that at the second Loveday, he would provide the entertainment.

Later years and death 

Although the King's health continued to decline, he improved sufficiently in 1411 to direct the formation of a new council of his loyal councillors; this intentionally excluded his son, Prince Henry and the prince's associates, Henry and Thomas Beaufort, from power. Ros—the "reliable royalist"—sat on the council for the next fifteen months with other "unswervingly loyal" officials, such as the Bishops of Durham and Bath and Wells and the Archbishop of York. Ros and the others now signed administrative documents which had required the king's signet seal. A. L. Brown and Henry Summerson, two of the king's recent biographers, note that "at the end of his reign, as at its beginning, Henry placed his trust principally in his Lancastrian retainers".

Henry IV died on 20 March 1413. William Ros played no significant role in government from then on, after probably attending his last council meeting in 1412. Charles Ross posits that he was "no particular favourite" of the new king, Henry V, which Ross attributed to Henry V's distrust of his father's loyalists (who, in his eyes, kept him from what he felt was his rightful position at the head of government during his father's illness). Whether or not Henry excluded him from the government, Ros lived only eighteen months into the new reign. His mother had drawn up her will in January 1414, of which Ros was an executor. Early that year, Ros sat on a final anti-Lollard commission and was tasked with investigating the murder of an MP in the Midlands.

Ros died in Belvoir Castle on 1 November 1414. He had drawn up his will two years earlier, and added a codicil in February 1414. He died a wealthy man, with one of Yorkshire's highest disposable incomes.

Three of William Ros's children fought in the last period of the Hundred Years' War. John, his heir, was born in 1397 and was legally a minor when Ros died. The Earl of Dorset, the king's cousin, received custody of the Ros estates. Before he inherited, John travelled to France with the new king in 1415 and fought at the Battle of Agincourt at the age of seventeen or eighteen. He died in 1421 at the Battle of Baugé with the king's brother, Thomas, Duke of Clarence and Sir Gilbert V de Umfraville. William Ros's second son Thomas was only fourteen at John's death, and fought with Thomas, Earl of Salisbury, at the siege of Orléans in 1428; he died after a skirmish outside Paris two years later. Thomas' heir (also named Thomas) inherited the lordship as 9th baron and played an important role in the Wars of the Roses fighting for the Lancastrian king, Henry VI; he was beheaded after his defeat by the Yorkists at the Battle of Hedgeley Moor in 1464. Ros's wife, Margaret Fitzalan, lived until 1438. She had received her dower by February 1415 and, at the marriage of Henry V to Catherine of Valois in 1420, entered the new queen's service as a lady-in-waiting. Margaret attended Katherine's coronation and travelled with her to see Henry in France two years later.

Family and bequests

With his wife, Margaret Fitzalan, William Ros had four sons: John, Thomas, Robert and Richard. They also had four daughters: Beatrice, Alice, Margaret and Elizabeth. Ros also had an illegitimate son, John, by a now-unknown woman. Charles Ross suggests that he "provides full confirmation of what the scanty evidence as to the character of his earlier career suggests, that Ros was a man of just and equitable temperament" by the nature and extent of his bequests. His heir, John, inherited his father's lordship and patrimony and his armour and a gold sword. His third son, Robert—whom Ross describes as "evidently his favourite"—also inherited a quantity of land. Ros made this provision for Robert from John's patrimony, a decision described by G. L. Harriss as "overrid[ing] both family duty and convention". His younger three sons (Thomas, Robert, and Richard) received a third of Ros's goods among them; Thomas, traditional for a younger son, was intended for an ecclesiastical career. Ros's wife, Margaret, received another third of his goods. His illegitimate son, John, received £40 towards his upkeep. Loyal retainers received benefices, and Ros's "humbler dependents"—for instance, the poor on his Lincolnshire estates—received often-massive sums among them. His executors—one of whom was his heir, John—received £20 each for their services. Ros was buried in Belvoir Priory, and an alabaster effigy was erected in St Mary the Virgin's Church, Bottesford, on the right side of the altar. Seven years later, after his death at Baugé, an effigy of his son John was placed on the left. William Ros left £400 to pay ten chaplains for eight years to educate his sons.

In Shakespeare 
William Ros appears in William Shakespeare's Richard II as Lord Ross. His character performs a double act of sorts with Lord Willoughby in their (ultimately successful) attempts to persuade the Earl of Northumberland to revolt against Richard, although as one reviewer has noted, indicating "little sense of rebels carefully testing the political water" before doing so. Together, the three of them are the core of the conspiracy to overthrow Richard. In their colloquies—for which R. F. Hill has compared them to a Senecan Chorus— they provide the audience with a catalogue of Richard's misdeeds by re-telling his history of poor governance. Ross, says Hill, is "lured" by the earl into conversation, which results in their plotting. Ross tells Northumberland, "The commons hath [King Richard] pill'd with grievous taxes / And quite lost their hearts: the nobles hath he fined / For ancient quarrels, and quite lost their hearts" and is portrayed as an overt follower of Henry Bolingbroke from the beginning. Shakespeare has this discussion take place in the north; in this way, says Hill, their separation from the King emphasises their geographical closeness to Bolingbroke.

The speed with which Ross deserts Richard and joins Henry is in stark contrast to the themes of loyalty and honour that the play deals with, suggests Margaret Shewring. Described by Shakespeare (based on Raphael Holinshed's chronicle) as "fiery-red with haste", Ross joins Bolingbroke at Berkeley, Gloucestershire. In 1738—when the public image of the King, George I, was poor—the play was put on by John Rich, in the knowledge that it was "dangerously topical in terms of contemporary politics". The discussion between Ross, Willoughby and Northumberland on the faults of the King—"basely led/by flatterers"—has been argued to have reflected contemporary disfavour with George, who was widely believed to be under the influence of his chief minister, Horace Walpole. A contemporary, Thomas Davies, watched the performance and later wrote how "almost every line that was spoken to the occurrences of the time, and to the measures and character of the ministry".

The text of Richard II is often cut by directors, either to tighten the plot or to avoid problems with weak casting, and the role of Lord Ross is occasionally omitted. For example, in the 1981 Bard Productions film, Ross' part was given to the Exton character, and in the Erickson-Farrell 2001 film, Ross was one of seven characters dropped, his part again given to Exton. He has still been played by several actors in post-war performances. At the 1947 Avignon Festival, Pierre Lautrec played to Jean Vilar's Richard; Vilar also directed the play. The same year, Walter Hudd directed it with the Shakespeare Memorial Theatre at Stratford-upon-Avon, with Joss Ackland as Ross to Robert Harris' Richard. Four years later, Anthony Quayle—also with the SMT—directed Michael Redgrave as the King, Harry Andrews as Bolingbroke, and Philip Morant in the part of Lord Ross. In 1968 the Prospect Theatre toured Richard II in two legs. Directed by Richard Cottrell and with Ian McKellen and Timothy West as Richard and Bolingbroke respectively, Ross was played by Peter Rocca on the first half of the tour and David Calder on the second. In 1973, Charles Keating played Ross to Richard Pasco and Ian Richardson's king and Bolingbroke, in John Barton's production. Ariane Mnouchkine's 1984 production for the Théâtre du Soleil cast Robert Gourp as Ross, and five years later the English Shakespeare Company's production—directed by Michael Bogdanov—had John Dougall playing Ross to Michael Pennington's Richard. Keith Dunphy played Ross in Steven Pimlott's RSC production in 2000, to Sam West's Richard and David Troughton's Bolingbroke. A production at the Globe Theatre in 2015 from Tim Carroll saw Mark Rylance as the King and Ekow Quartey as Ross. Jonathan Slinger played the King in Michael Boyd's 2007 RSC production, and Rob Carroll played Ross. Joshua Richards played Ross in Gregory Doran's 2013 production, with David Tennant in the lead role.

Notes

References

Bibliography 

 
 
 
 
 
 
 
 
 
 
 
 
 
 
 
 
 
 
 
 
 
 
 
 
 
 

 
 
 
 
 
 
 
 
 
 
 
 
 
 
 
 
 
 
 
 
 
 
 
 
 
 
 
 
 
 
 
 
 
 
 
 
 
 
 
 
 
 
 
 
 
 
 
 
 
 
 
 
 
 
 
 
 
 
 
 
  
 
 
 
 
 
 
 

1370s births
Ros, William, 6th Baron
14th-century English nobility
15th-century English nobility
06
English politicians
Ros, William, 6th Baron
Lord High Treasurers of England
Male Shakespearean characters